The name Super League 2012 may refer to the sporting events:

 Super League XVII in rugby league, in England and France
 2012 WABA Super League in basketball in West Asia
 2012 Chinese Super League in football (soccer)
 2012 Malaysia Super League in football
 2012 Vietnamese Super League in football

See also
 Super League (disambiguation)